Androtium is a monotypic genus of trees in the cashew or sumac family Anacardiaceae. It contains the single species Androtium astylum. The generic name  is from the Greek meaning "male ear-lobe", referring to the shape of the lobe of the stamen. The specific epithet  is from the Latin meaning "without style", referring to the plant's ovary.

Description
Its finely cracked bark is chocolate-brown with grey patches. The flowers are white.

Distribution and habitat
Androtium astylum grows naturally in Peninsular Malaysia and Borneo. Its habitat is lowland forests including swamps.

References

Anacardiaceae
Trees of Peninsular Malaysia
Trees of Borneo
Monotypic Sapindales genera
Anacardiaceae genera